John Delamere (born 18 February 1956) is an Irish former professional footballer who played as a striker.

Playing career
Delamere played in Ireland with Shelbourne, Limerick and Sligo Rovers. At Shelbourne he was their topscorer for a few seasons. He signed for Sligo Rovers in January 1978 to replace Mick Leonard.

He spent the 1981–82 season with Dutch club PEC Zwolle. Author Gerjos Weelink described Delamere as a "purebred cult figure".

Later life
As of September 2009, he was the President of amateur club Galty Celtic, and also sponsored the club's kits.

Personal life
Delamere's step-brother Paddy Turner was also a footballer.

References

1956 births
Living people
Republic of Ireland association footballers
Shelbourne F.C. players
Limerick F.C. players
Sligo Rovers F.C. players
PEC Zwolle players
Eredivisie players
Republic of Ireland expatriate association footballers
Irish expatriate sportspeople in the Netherlands
Expatriate footballers in the Netherlands
Association football forwards